Umbite (chemical formula ) is a potassium zirconosilicate mineral found in northern Russia. Named after Lake Umb (Lake Umbozero), its type locality is Vuonnemiok River Valley, Khibiny Massif, Kola Peninsula, Murmanskaja Oblast', Northern Region, Russia.

References 

Inosilicates
Orthorhombic minerals
Minerals in space group 19